Felipe Ezcurra (born 15 April 1993) is an Argentine rugby union player. He plays as a scrum-half.

Born in Buenos Aires Ezcurra played for Hindú Club in the Nacional de Clubes.

He played for Pampas XV and for Argentina Jaguars. He has 2 caps for Argentina, in 2014, for the South American Rugby Championship, without scoring. He was called for the 2015 Rugby Championship, but he never played.

He signed for English side Leicester Tigers in Premiership Rugby on 30 September 2018 on a short term contract. But did not feature on the pitch and returned to Argentina later that year.

References

External links
Felipe Ezcurra at UAR Official Website (Spanish)

1993 births
Living people
Argentine rugby union players
Argentina international rugby union players
Hindú Club players
Pampas XV players
Rugby union scrum-halves
Rugby union players from Buenos Aires
Jaguares (Super Rugby) players
Leicester Tigers players
FC Grenoble players